Masoud Kimiai (or Masoud Kimiaei, born 29 July 1941) is an Iranian director, screenwriter and producer.

Biography 
Kimiai started his career as an assistant director and made his debut, Come Stranger, in 1968. With his second film, Qeysar (also known as Qaiser and Gheisar) (1969), he and Dariush Mehrjui with the film The Cow, caused a historical change in Iranian film industry as the features that are considered the first films of the "Iranian New Wave". Qeysar became a great success at the box office and opened the way for young, talented filmmakers who never had a chance in the industry before.

His films deal with people at the margin of the society with his anti-hero characters that die at the end. Many directors of commercial films imitated his Qeysarin the next couple of years, but he later shifted his focus to young antagonists. He usually writes his screenplays, using slang dialogue based on ordinary traditional people's dialect, which has received attention alongside criticism from Iranians in its unrealistic nature. 

In 1991, he was awarded a prize in 41st Berlin International Film Festival for his Snake Fang. This was not his sole international prize. At the Cairo International Film festival in 1979 he got from the International Catholic Organisation for Cinema (OCIC), the OCIC Prize for his film The Journey of the Stone. The international OCIC jury gave its award to this film because The Journey of the Stone denounced the exploitation of mankind by mankind and called for a more just social order. 

He has been married three times. He was married to the late Iranian pop singer Giti Pashaei until 1991, afterwards he married the Iranian pop singer Googoosh.

Filmography 
 Come Stranger, 1968
 Qeysar, 1969
 Reza Motorcyclist  (1970)
 Dash Akol, 1971
 The Soil, 1973
 Baluch, 1972
 The Deer, 1974
 The Horse (short film)
 The Oriental Boy (short film), 1974
 Ghazal, 1976
 The Journey of the Stone, 1978
 The Red Line, 1982
 The Blade and the Silk, 1987
 The Lead, 1988
 Snake Fang, 1990
 The Sergeant, 1991
 The Wolf's Trail, 1992
 Fist, 1995
 Trade, 1995
 The Feast, 1996
 Mercedes, 1998
 Cry, 1999
 Complain, 2002
 Future Soldiers, 2004
 The Command, 2005
 The Boss, 2006
 Trial on the Street, 2009
 Crime, 2011
 Qeysar 40 years later (Documentary), 2011
 Metropole, 2014
 Domestic Killer, 2016
 Blood, 2019
 Reverse, 2019
There Was Blood, 2020
 Killing a Traitor, 2022

Awards
 Nominated Crystal Simorgh Best Director Fajr International Film Festival 2000
 Winner Special Jury Prize Montreal World Film Festival 1992
 Honourable Mention 41st Berlin International Film Festival 1991
 Nominated Crystal Simorgh Best Trailer Fajr International Film Festival 1989
 OCIC International Catholic Organization for Cinema 1979
 Winner Award fot Best Director Cairo International Film Festival 1979
 Winner Silver Medal International Filmfestival Mannheim-Heidelberg 1976
 Best Script Tashkent International Film Forum 1971
 Best Film and Writer Sepas Film Festival 1969
 Best Director Sepas Film Festival 1969

Bibliography
 Jassadhaye Shishe-ei (Novel)
 Hassad Bar Zendegi Ein-al-Qozat (Novel)
 Zakhm Aql (Poetry)

References

External links

 

1941 births
Living people
Iranian film directors
People from Tehran
Iranian scenic designers
Producers who won the Best Film Crystal Simorgh